My Son John is a 1952 American political drama film directed by Leo McCarey and starring Helen Hayes, Van Heflin, Robert Walker and Dean Jagger. Walker plays the title character, a middle-class college graduate whom his parents suspect may be a communist spy.

The strongly anticommunist film, produced during the height of McCarthyism, received an Oscar nomination for Best Writing, Motion Picture Story. The nomination was later viewed as a possible attempt by the motion picture industry to signal its loyalty to the ongoing anticommunist campaign. Retrospective reviews have characterized it as a propaganda film indicative of attitudes during the Second Red Scare.

My Son John was Walker's final role; he died in August 1951, midway through principal photography.

Plot
In uniform, Chuck and Ben Jefferson, strapping blonds who played high-school football, attend Sunday Mass with their parents before leaving for army service in Korea. Their older brother John sends regrets that he cannot join their farewell dinner because of his work for the federal government in Washington, D.C.
 
A week later, John pays a surprise visit to his parents, his devoutly Catholic mother Lucille and American Legionnaire father Dan. In conversation with them and their parish priest, John uses humor to make provocative statements and his attitude is resented. He spends hours with one of his college professors, leaving his parents feeling shortchanged. Anxious about his son's behavior, Dan gets into a car crash with John's college friend Stedman. Dan questions John's loyalty after he mocks his anticommunist speech to the Legion and tries to rewrite it. After Dan accuses him of being a communist and threatens him, John assures Lucille of his loyalty by swearing on her Bible, but Dan refuses to believe his son, and after an argument about the veracity of the Bible beats him and tears his trousers.

The next morning, John asks Lucille to retrieve his trousers from the church clothing drive, and she finds a key. Stedman returns to inform her that he is an FBI agent investigating John. His mother tells John to "think with your heart, not your head." When she returns the trousers to John, he claims it was a normal loyalty check. Lucille discovers that the key is for an apartment of a female Soviet spy with whom John confesses to having an affair. Lucille refuses to accept his assurances of loyalty and begs him to confess, and declares that he deserves to be punished. However, John points out that the court will refuse to accept Lucille's testimony since she is suffering from a mental illness, which Stedman accuses John of causing.

Stedman advises him that he should "use whatever free will you have. Give up. Name names." John tries to flee the country on a flight to Lisbon, but at the last minute finds faith in God, repents his actions and decides to turn himself in to Stedman. However, John is killed by communist agents before he can do so, but he tells Stedman that he left a tape-recorded confession, which Stedman plays at his college's commencement exercises. Later at church, Dan consoles a distraught Lucille, saying that John's actions will eventually be forgotten but that his words will be remembered.

Cast

Production
The film was based on an idea by Leo McCarey and developed into a script by John Lee Mahin. Paramount built interest in the project by reporting the casting of each role, beginning with the news in December 1950 that Helen Hayes was considering it for her return to motion pictures after 17 years away from the film industry. The details of the story were kept secret while it was first described in one news report as "a contemporary drama about the relationship between a mother and son, described by McCarey as 'highly emotional but with much humor'." Hedda Hopper reported that the script "has gotten raves from everyone who's read it."

Despite McCarey's "close-mouthed silence" for two months and a public warning to Hayes not to discuss the plot, it was reported that "word has gotten around Hollywood with the authority such wisps of information always have that the son ... is a traitor to his country–an agent of Communist espionage." Daily Variety reported that Hayes, mirroring certain current events, would shoot her son in the film and be tried for his murder. Hayes called it "a natural, human part" for which she did not have to worry about her appearance. She denied that the film's message attracted her to the project: "I just like the character and the story. I am deadly set against messages as the prime factor for taking a part. But I do feel the picture is a very exciting comment on a certain phase of our living today."

In February 1951, Robert Walker was borrowed from MGM to play the title role. That same month, Dean Jagger signed. Van Heflin signed in April 1951.

Ten days into shooting, the plot's unknown elements continued to garner press coverage. McCarey denied that the script was the Alger Hiss story and said that it had a "happy ending." He said:

An scene with Van Heflin delivering the speech at the end of the film was shot at the Wilshire-Ebell Theater in Los Angeles, but the script was rewritten so that Robert Walker would perform the speech instead. However, Walker died on August 28, 1951, less than a week after completing principal photography on the film and only a few hours after recording the audio for the ending speech. Because Walker was unavailable for the reshoots for the scene, the script was changed so that Walker's character would be killed before the commencement, with a recording of his speech to be played along with a shot of Walker from Alfred Hitchcock's Strangers on a Train for the death scene. The shots of the audience from the originally filmed ending were used in the final film, with new shots of the recording playing from an empty lectern.

Filming took place in Washington, D.C., Manassas, Virginia and Hollywood.

Reception
The picture was not a success at the box office. It grossed under $1 million and failed to make the list of the top 90 pictures of the year as compiled by Variety.

Bosley Crowther wrote in his review for The New York Times that the film represented its time perfectly in that it "corresponds with the present public ferment of angry resentment and fear" and that it is "a picture so strongly dedicated to the purpose of the American anti-Communist purge that it seethes with the sort of emotionalism and illogic that is characteristic of so much thinking these days." He wrote that allowing a mother to condemn her son based on flimsy evidence shows the film's "hot emotional nature" and that its endorsement of bigotry and argument for religious conformity would "cause a thoughtful person to feel a shudder of apprehension." While praising all of the actors, Crowther regretted the film's "snide anti-intellectual stance." Soon after the film opened, Crowther noted that My Son John provided an ironic contrast to the public outcry about communist subversion in the film industry on the part of the American Legion and the Catholic War Veterans. He wrote:

Other critics underscored the cultural attitudes behind the film's politics. In the New York Herald Tribune, Ogden Reid, later a congressman, wrote: "McCarey's picture of how America ought to be is so frightening, so speciously argued, so full of warnings against an intelligent solution to the problem that it boomerangs upon its own cause."

The New Yorker wrote that the film advised the public to "cut out thinking, obey their superiors blindly, regard all political suspects as guilty without trial, revel in joy through strength, and pay more attention to football."

Others have appreciated that the film locates the ideological conflict within a complex set of family relations, with father and son competing for the same woman's affection, but noted that John is not just intellectual, but "an unathletic, sexually ambiguous intellectual," both "sullen" and "slick." Others have interpreted John's character as homosexual.

In response to negative reviews from the New York critics, the Catholic Press Institute unanimously endorsed a resolution praising the film and Senator Karl Mundt entered a statement into the Congressional Record calling it "undoubtedly the greatest and most stirring pro-American motion picture of the last decade. ... It should be seen by the people of every American home." McCarey told the magazine Motion Picture that he felt mistreated and hurt.

A month after the film opened, the Catholic Press Association awarded McCarey its 1952 Literary Prize for "exemplification of Christian, Catholic principles," citing his work on My Son John and other films.

In 1998, Jonathan Rosenbaum of the Chicago Reader included the film in his unranked list of the best American films not included on the AFI Top 100.

Legacy
Patricia Bosworth, writing about a festival of blacklist-era films in 1992, characterized My Son John as "hysterical" and "the anti-Communist movie to end all anti-Communist movies."

Some have surmised that McCarey had lost his hallmark deep sympathy for his characters by the 1950s. Stuart Klawans wrote in The New York Times in 2002 that "gentleness itself had become a sin." In his view, McCarey's "exquisitely sensitive" handling of the mother-son relationship in the first part of the film was undercut by Myles Connolly, a screenwriter known for writing many a "bullying speech" for Frank Capra. Klawans hears Connolly's tone in the film's finale, a commencement address warning the young against liberalism.

J. Hoberman noted the film's dual personality, writing that it "aspires to the warmth of a domestic comedy while remaining tendentious to the core, relentlessly unfunny and starkly melodramatic."

References

External links

1952 films
1952 drama films
American anti-communist propaganda films
American drama films
American black-and-white films
1950s English-language films
Films directed by Leo McCarey
Films scored by Robert Emmett Dolan
Films shot in Virginia
Films shot in Washington, D.C.
Paramount Pictures films
McCarthyism
1950s American films
Red Scare